This is a navigational list of empires.

Empires and dynasties

See also
 List of former sovereign states
 List of former monarchies
 List of medieval great powers
 Middle Eastern empires
Political history of the world

References

External links
 Pella, John & Erik Ringmar, History of International Relations Open Textbook Project, Cambridge: Open Book, forthcoming.

Empires